The Western Union (WU), also referred to as the Brussels Treaty Organisation (BTO), was the European military alliance established between France, the United Kingdom (UK) and the three Benelux countries in September 1948 in order to implement the Treaty of Brussels signed in March the same year. Under this treaty the signatories, referred to as the five powers, agreed to collaborate in the defence field  as well as in the political, economic and cultural fields.

During the Korean War (1950–1953), the headquarters, personnel and plans of the WU's defence arm, the Western Union Defence Organisation (WUDO), were transferred to the newly established North Atlantic Treaty Organisation (NATO), providing the nucleus of the European half of NATO's command structure (Allied Command Europe), led by Supreme Headquarters Allied Powers Europe (SHAPE). As a consequence of the failure of the European Defence Community in 1954, the London and Paris Conferences led to the Modified Treaty of Brussels (MTB) through which the Western Union was transformed into the Western European Union (WEU) and was joined by Italy and West Germany. As the WEU's functions were transferred to the European Union's (EU) European Security and Defence Policy (ESDP) at the turn of the 21st century, the Western Union is a precursor of both NATO and the military arm of the EU.

History

Background

In the aftermath of World War II, there were fears of a renewal of German aggression. On 4 March 1947, the Treaty of Dunkirk was signed by France and the United Kingdom as a Treaty of Alliance and Mutual Assistance in the event of a possible attack.

In his speech to the House of Commons on 22 January 1948, British Foreign Secretary Ernest Bevin called for the extension of the Treaty of Dunkirk to also include the Benelux countries, creating a Western Union. The object was to consolidate Western Europe to satisfy the United States and to give advance notice of the eventual incorporation of Italy, and then Germany, into the Treaty.

The negotiating conference was held on 4 March 1948, a few days after the coup in Prague; thanks to this, the three smaller countries were able to persuade the others to agree to the concept of automatic and immediate mutual assistance in the event of aggression, and to the idea of setting up a regional organisation (a multilateral alliance in accordance with Article 51 of the Charter of the United Nations).

The Western Union was intended to provide Western Europe with a bulwark against the communist threat and to bring greater collective security.

Formation

The Treaty of Brussels was signed on 17 March 1948 between Belgium, France, Luxembourg, the Netherlands and the United Kingdom, and was an expansion to the preceding year's defence pledge, the Dunkirk Treaty signed between Britain and France.

Although the Treaty goes no further than providing for 'cooperation' between the contracting parties, 'which will be effected through the Consultative Council referred to in Article VII as well as through other bodies', in practice the arrangement was referred to as Western Union or the Brussels Treaty Organisation.

Cannibalisation and marginalisation
When the division of Europe into two opposing camps became unavoidable, the threat of the U.S.S.R. became much more important than the threat of German rearmament. Western Europe, therefore, sought a new mutual defence pact involving the United States, a powerful military force for such an alliance. The United States, concerned with containing the influence of the U.S.S.R., was responsive. Secret meetings began by the end of March 1949 between American, Canadian and British officials to initiate the negotiations that led to the signing of the North Atlantic Treaty on 4 April 1949 in Washington, D.C.

The need to back up the commitments of the North Atlantic Treaty with appropriate political and military structures led to the creation of the North Atlantic Treaty Organisation (NATO). On 20 December 1950 the Consultative Council of the Brussels Treaty Powers decided to merge the military organisation of the Western Union into NATO. In December 1950, with the appointment of General Eisenhower as the first Supreme Allied Commander Europe (SACEUR), the members of the Treaty of Brussels decided to transfer the headquarters, personnel, and plans of the Western Union Defence Organisation (WUDO) to NATO. NATO's Supreme Headquarters Allied Powers Europe (SHAPE) took over responsibility for the defence of Western Europe, while the physical headquarters in Fontainebleau were transformed into NATO's Headquarters, Allied Forces Central Europe (AFCENT). Field Marshal Bernard Montgomery resigned as Chairman of WUDO's Land, Naval and Air Commanders-in-Chief Committee on 31 March 1951 and took the position of Deputy Supreme Allied Commander Europe (DSACEUR) on 1 April 1951.

The establishment of NATO, along with the signing of a succession of treaties establishing the Organisation for European Economic Cooperation (April 1948), the North Atlantic Treaty Organisation (April 1949), the Council of Europe (May 1949) and the European Coal and Steel Community (April 1951), left the Western Union and its founding Treaty of Brussels devoid of much of its authority.

Transformation into the Western European Union

The Western Union's founding Treaty of Brussels was amended at the 1954 Paris Conference as a result of the failure of the Treaty establishing the European Defence Community (EDC) to gain French ratification: The General Treaty of 1952 formally named the EDC as a prerequisite to the end of Allied occupation of Germany, and there was a desire to include Germany in the Western defence architecture. The Modified Brussels Treaty (MBT) transformed the Western Union into the Western European Union (WEU), at which point Italy and Germany were admitted. Although the WEU established by the MBT was significantly less powerful and ambitious than the original Western Union, German membership in the WEU was considered sufficient for the occupation of the country to end in accordance with the General Treaty.

Social and cultural aspects were handed to the Council of Europe to avoid duplication of responsibilities within Europe.

Social, cultural initiative

The Treaty of Brussels had cultural and social clauses, concepts for the setting up of a 'Consultative Council'. The basis for this was that a cooperation between Western nations would help stop the spread of Communism.

Examples of this cooperation include
 the Cultural Identity Card, which the WU instituted to give mutual facilities to each member state for cultural purposes. It could be issued to student, teachers and researchers. It carried an embossed stamp representing the Brussels Town Hall. The WU card was superseeded by the Council of Europe cultural identity Card.
 the 1951 Western Union International Guide for Young People

Defence Organisation

From April 1948, the member states of the Western Union decided to create a military agency under the name of the Western Union Defence Organisation (WUDO). WUDO was formally established on September 27–28, 1948.

The objective of WUDO was to provide for the coordination of defence between the five powers in the military and supply fields and for the study of the tactical problems of the defence of Western Europe; in addition, to provide a framework on which, in the event of any emergency, a command organization could be built up.

The Treaty of Brussels contained a mutual defence clause as set forth in Article IV:

Article V set forth the obligations of Brussels Pact members to cooperate with the United Nations Security Council to maintain international peace and security, and Article VI set forth the obligations of Brussels Pact members to not enter any third-party treaties that conflicted with the Treaty of Brussels.

See also

 Treaty establishing the European Defence Community
 Western European Union
 European Union
 Treaty of Brussels
 Common Security and Defence Policy
History of the Common Security and Defence Policy
 North Atlantic Treaty Organization
History of NATO
Supreme Headquarters Allied Powers Europe
Supreme Allied Commander Europe

Notes
Footnotes

Citations

Further reading
The Western Union and its Defence Organization, RUSI Journal, 94:576, 519-535 (1949), DOI: 10.1080/03071844909419583

External links

 History of the Western Union, European Navigator
 Western Union ‘International Guide for Young People’ (1951)
 British parliamentary resolution
 Work of the Brussels Treaty Organisation between May, 1948 and September, 1952
 NATO_Facts_and_Figures_1989
 Archives
 Life Magazine Article from 25 April 1949
 London Illustrated News
 London Illustrated News article 1
 London Illustrated News article 2
 Locations 1
 Locations 2
 Montgomery visiting Chateau des Fougeres
 SHAPE history
 Memorandum by the Joint Chiefs of Staff to the Secretary of Defense (Forrestal)
 Operation Bulldog
 Keeping the Peace
 A Community of Interests: NATO and the Military Assistance Program, 1948-1951
 1951 Agreement with the Council of Europe
Clip

 
Intergovernmental organizations
20th-century military alliances
European integration
Former international organizations
Intergovernmental organizations established by treaty
International organizations based in Europe
Military history of the European Union
Cold War organizations
1948 in military history
Military units and formations established in 1948
Organizations disestablished in 1951
Military alliances involving France
Military alliances involving Luxembourg
Military alliances involving the Netherlands
Military alliances involving Belgium
Military alliances involving the United Kingdom
History of NATO
Belgium–France relations
Belgium–Luxembourg relations
Belgium–Netherlands relations
Belgium–United Kingdom military relations
France–Luxembourg relations
France–Netherlands military relations
France–United Kingdom military relations
Luxembourg–Netherlands relations
Luxembourg–United Kingdom relations
Netherlands–United Kingdom military relations